Itsaraphap station is a Bangkok MRT rapid transit station on the Blue Line, recognized as one of the four most beautiful MRT stations (consisted of Itsaraphap station, Sanam Chai station, Sam Yot station, and Wat Mangkon station).

Itsaraphap station is the first and only underground station in the Thonburi side and is the last underground before elevating above ground to the Tha Phra station. The station is bridged to Sanam Chai station through a tunnel running below the Chao Phraya River, with distance from the water surface to the tunnel approx. 30 m (98 ft) in depth, traversing horizontally under the Itsaraphap Road from Soi Itsaraphap 23 to Soi Itsaraphap 34.

The design of this station is based on the swan, a mythical creature which represents good fortune, and is also the symbol of Wat Hong Rattanaram, a temple with a very long history, built since the Ayutthaya era, in order to convey the history of the neighbouring areas, such as Wat Ratchasittharam, Wat Arun Ratchawararam (temple of dawn), Wat Hong Rattanaram, Thonburi Palace etc.

From this station, passengers can travel to various important places nearby, such as Dhonburi Rajabhat University, Bansomdej Chaopraya Rajabhat University, Kudi Chin Community, Taweethapisek School, Thonburi Hospital, Siriraj Hospital, Thonburi Railway Station with bus, songthaew (a type of tuk-tuk) or motorbike taxi.

Gallery

References 

MRT (Bangkok) stations
2019 establishments in Thailand
Railway stations opened in 2019